Bross is a patronymic surname of German origin. The Latin name Ambrosius (of which "Bross" is a reduced form) was popular in early Christian Germany primarily because of the fame of Saint Ambrose of Milan (Aurelius Ambrosius), whose name comes from the Greek Αμβροσιος (Ambrosios) which means “immortal” or “divine.” The portion of the etymology of Aμβρόσιος from which Bross comes is βροτός (Brotos) which means "mortal."

Demographics

The 2000 United States Census records 2,486 individuals with the surname Bross living in the United States and there are roughly 7,000 individuals worldwide. 159 live in France though they are almost exclusively clustered in the regions to the extreme East, near the border with Germany. Thus, 66 percent of Brosses live in the US, Germany, and France, with the greatest concentration found in the German state of Baden-Württemberg centered around the western portions of the Black Forest.

There are several French names which begin with Bross but they are, insomuch as contemporary research can tell, not related to the German form. (Examples include Brosseau and Brossard.)

In popular culture
In the fictional Star Wars universe, Bross is the name of a starfighter pilot in the New Republic's Gold Squadron.

Prominent people surnamed Bross
Eric Bross
Mal Bross
Rebecca Bross
Simón Bross
Stephen Decatur Bross
Terry Bross
William Bross

See also 
Mount Bross (A mountain summit in the US state of Colorado)
Fort Bross (A Confederate fort in the State of Virginia)

References 

German-language surnames
Patronymic surnames